Rhinophoroides is a genus of parasitic flies in the family Tachinidae.

Distribution
South Africa

References

Dexiinae
Tachinidae genera
Diptera of Africa
Monotypic Brachycera genera